Aberedw is a village and community in Radnorshire, Powys, Wales. Its population was 229, according to the 2011 census; a 4.57% increase since the 219 people noted in 2001. The 2011 census showed 4.8% of the population could speak Welsh, a fall from 11.2% in 2001.

The ruins of the medieval Aberedw Castle are nearby. The village of Llanbadarn y Garreg is in the community.

It is also the site of Llywelyn ap Gruffudd's death, commonly thought to have occurred in Cilmeri.

The church of St Cewydd is a grade II* listed building.

References

External links 
Photos of Aberedw and surrounding area on geograph.org.uk

Communities in Powys
Villages in Powys